"Add It Up" is a song by American rock band Violent Femmes, released on their 1983 debut album Violent Femmes.

It contains the lyrics:

Band member Gordon Gano commented:

The song title was used as the name for the compilation album by the group, Add It Up (1981–1993).

Some radio stations substitute a guitar note for the swear word for airplay.

Used in other media 

 Ethan Hawke's character in the 1994 film Reality Bites plays a cover of "Add It Up" with his band Hey That's My Bike.
 The song is featured in the soundtrack of the 2004 skateboarding video game Tony Hawk's Underground 2.
 The song was covered on a cello and piano, as are several other Violent Femmes songs, in the 2007 film Rocket Science. 
 Canadian singer Shawn Mendes performed a cover of the song during the season 3 premiere of The 100. A music video for the cover was released by The CW. Violent Femmes bassist Brian Ritchie responded positively to the rendition through the band's official Facebook page, saying "It’s a testament to the universality expressed in [the song] that it can be resurrected with a different result even after 35 years and still sound current."

Notes and references

External links
 "Add It Up – an Interview with the Elder Statesmen of Disaffected Youth, the Violent Femmes"

1983 songs
Songs written by Gordon Gano
Violent Femmes songs